Eugene K. Palmer (born April 4, 1939) is an American fugitive wanted for allegedly killing his daughter-in-law, Tammy Palmer, in Stony Point, New York, on September 24, 2012. On May 29, 2019, he was named by the FBI as the 523rd fugitive to be placed on its Ten Most Wanted list. On July 20, 2022, Palmer was removed from the FBI's Most Wanted Fugitives List. Despite his removal from the Top Ten List, Palmer remains a wanted fugitive.

Background
Eugene Palmer's son, John Palmer, was married to Tammy Palmer, and the couple lived together with their two children at a property owned by Eugene in Stony Point, New York. Eugene lived next door to the couple. The relationship between John and Tammy began to deteriorate, and they eventually started seeing other people. Tammy filed for a restraining order against John, and this  enraged Eugene. Tammy also threatened to file for divorce and sue for the land belonging to Eugene. Authorities say this started a feud between Eugene and Tammy that would culminate in a heated confrontation several days before the murder of Tammy.

Murder
On the morning of Monday, September 24, 2012, Tammy walked her two children to the school bus. It is believed that Eugene Palmer hid in the woods, lying in wait to ambush her on her return home. When Tammy walked back toward her home, Palmer allegedly began firing his shotgun at her from a distance. The first shot struck her in the arm, the second missed; but the third shot, delivered at close range, hit her in the chest and proved fatal. After the shooting, Palmer fled the scene in a green Dodge Ram pickup; the truck would later be found abandoned outside Harriman State Park in Rockland County. Apparently Palmer ditched the truck and fled into the park on foot. When police called in search dogs, they followed Palmer's scent to a campground in the woods. Despite multiple searches, no further trace of Palmer has been found since.

In September 2014, a New York Supreme Court judge awarded Tammy's children $2.15 million (equivalent to $ million in ) — the estimated value of Palmer's entire estate — after determining by a preponderance of the evidence that Palmer killed their mother.

Investigation
A federal arrest warrant was issued for Eugene Palmer on June 10, 2013. Family members of his have expressed their belief that he died in the park; however, according to Haverstraw police, no body was ever discovered after multiple searches of the area. Palmer depends on medications for a heart condition and diabetes. Eugene Palmer is an outdoorsman—an experienced hunter, angler, and hiker—and is also described as a car enthusiast. He has a deformed left thumb. Authorities believe he may be hiding in Florida or Upstate New York, where he has relatives.

On May 29, 2019, Palmer was added to the FBI Ten Most Wanted Fugitives list.

On August 17, 2021, acting on a tip, the FBI searched the home of one of Palmer's granddaughters in Warwick, New York but ultimately found nothing.

On July 20, 2022, Palmer was removed from the FBI Ten Most Wanted Fugitives list after it was determined that he no longer fit the list criteria. He was replaced by Omar Alexander Cardenas. Despite his removal, he remains a wanted fugitive.

In popular culture
On March 25, 2020, Palmer was the focus of an episode of In Pursuit with John Walsh. On March 15, 2021, he was featured on the first episode of the revival of America's Most Wanted. On August 25, 2021, Palmer was the subject of an episode of the Unsolved Mysteries podcast.

See also
 List of fugitives from justice who disappeared

References

1939 births
Living people
2012 murders in the United States
21st-century American criminals
American male criminals
American murderers
Criminals from New York (state)
FBI Ten Most Wanted Fugitives
Fugitives wanted by the United States
Fugitives wanted on murder charges
Male murderers
People from Stony Point, New York